Susanne Celik (born 6 December 1994) is a Swedish former tennis player of Syriac descent. She has a WTA career-high singles ranking of 153, achieved on 18 July 2016, and a best doubles ranking of world 404, reached on 15 August 2016. She won seven singles and four doubles titles on the ITF Women's Circuit.

Playing for Sweden Fed Cup team, Celik has a win–loss record of 0–5.

ITF Circuit finals

Singles: 16 (7 titles, 9 runner–ups)

Doubles: 6 (4 titles, 2 runner–ups)

Fed Cup participation

Singles (0–4)

Doubles (0–1)

External links
 
 
 

1994 births
Living people
Swedish female tennis players
Swedish people of Assyrian/Syriac descent
Sportspeople from Örebro
20th-century Swedish women
21st-century Swedish women